Our Lady of Caysasay Academy (OLCA) is a Roman Catholic educational institution located in Taal, Batangas, Philippines.

History and status 
Sisters from the Benedictine Missionary Congregation came to Taal as war evacuees in 1945 and lived in a borrowed house. The Sisters taught piano, mathematics and other subjects and ran a kindergarten school. After the war, they were asked to return at the invitation of Alfredo Verzosa, then Bishop of Lipa, to run a school. After much consultation, the Mother Prioress and her councilors decided to accept the offer. Sister Superior Agnella Mayer was asked to found the school with the help of Sister Caridad Barrion and Sister Liboria Kampinan. The school was first named St. Martin's Academy.

Bishop Versoza, who was then staying at St. Bridget's College, wanted the school to be named in honor of the Virgin Mary. Thus, the school was renamed to Our Lady of Caysasay Academy. The Sisters of St. Bridget's College delivered the books that were first used. They were also the ones who transported the Benedictine Sisters on April 15, 1945. Mariano Lasala, the parish priest of Taal at the time, was still in the convent which he generously vacated the next day for the use of the Sisters.

After several years, a high school building was erected under the administration of Sister Hyginia Peralta. This was later converted into the grade school building when a twelve-room high school building was constructed. A convent was also built for the Sisters who lived there while administering the school. With the student population increasing every year, several annex buildings were built.

In 1970, OLCA had its first two lay principals: Mercedes Anorico for the grade school and Tita M. Alcazar for the high school.

The grade school department was co-educational from the beginning, while the high school was exclusive to girls. Starting in 1983, boys were accepted in the high school department. The first class of male graduates numbered 28.

On April 27, 1993, the Benedictine Sisters through Sister Pia Lansang turned over the school to the Archdiocese of Lipa in the presence of Salvador Q. Quizon, who represented Archbishop Mariano Gaviola. The Oblates of the Holy Spirit (OSS) assisted the Director from 1993 to 1996.

The Community of the Missionary Catechists of the Sacred Heart (MCSH) was invited to assist in the school administration and religious formation in 1996. Sister Mary Regina Conti was appointed Assistant Directress.

External links
Official website

References

Taal, Batangas
Schools in Batangas